The district of  Taolagnaro (or: Fort Dauphin district) is a district of Anosy in Madagascar.

Communes
The district is further divided into 24 communes:

 Ambatoabo
 Ampasimena
 Ampasy Nahampoa
 Analamary
 Analapatsy
 Andranombory
 Ankaramena
 Bevoay
 Enakara-Haut
 Enaniliha
 Fenoevo
 Iabakoho
 Ifarantsa
 Isaka-Ivondro
 Mahatalaky
 Manambaro
 Manantenina
 Mandiso
 Mandromodromotra
 Ranomafana
 Ranopiso
 Sarasambo
 Soanierana
 Fort-Dauphin

Roads
 the National Road 12a, from Fort-Dauphin to Vangaindrano.
 the National Road 13, from Fort-Dauphin to Ambovombe and Ihosy.

Airport
Tolagnaro Airport

Seaport
 Port d'Ehoala

References 

Districts of Anosy